Patrick Higgins may refer to:
Patrick Higgins (American football) (born 1963), American football coach and former player
Patrick Higgins (musician) (born 1984), American composer, guitarist and producer
Patrick Higgins (politician) (1825–1882), Irish-born Australian politician
Pat Higgins (born 1974), film director
Pat Higgins (businessman) (born ), New Zealand businessman and philanthropist